Admiral Charles Pipon Beaty-Pownall, CMG (1 January 1872 – 17 August 1938) was a Royal Navy officer.

References 

1872 births
1938 deaths
Royal Navy admirals
Royal Navy admirals of World War I
Companions of the Order of St Michael and St George